The Isuzu Piazza is a small, sporty 3-door liftback coupé which was manufactured by Isuzu from 1981 until 1992 in two generations. The Isuzu Piazza was marketed as the Isuzu Impulse in North America and as the Holden Piazza in Australia.

The first generation Piazza was a rear-wheel drive car, and in the United Kingdom it was the first widely available Isuzu passenger car. The second generation was available as front-wheel drive or all-wheel drive. It was the basis for the lower-priced Gemini Coupé, known as the Geo Storm in the US market.

As of 2010, the number of registered Impulses in North America totaled only 2,300, making Impulses very rare. The car was produced in very low numbers, totaling slightly over 13,000 units, with that number including the production of the Isuzu Stylus.



First generation (JR120/130; 1980) 

In 1978, Isuzu commissioned Giorgetto Giugiaro to design a new sporty car to replace the 117 Coupe (also a Giugiaro design). They delivered several T Series Chevettes (developed in 1973 in South America) to the Italdesign studio in Italy and allowed Giugiaro free rein over the design. The result of this effort was the wedge-shaped three-door hatchback called the Asso di Fiori ("Ace of Clubs") prototype and show car. It was shown at the 1979 Tokyo Motor Show to rave reviews. Giugiaro referred to the design as his fifth "Copernican revolution", integrating the design innovations of many different previous designs into one, mass producible, vehicle. Within 48 hours of its unveiling at the Tokyo Motor Show, Isuzu fast tracked the vehicle into production with minimal changes to the design. Items that remained were the single blade front windshield wiper, and an integrated steering wheel adjustment that also moved the instrument cluster, with wiper controls and exterior lighting controls installed just behind the steering wheel on either side, a feature that later appeared on the Ford Probe.

Five-speed manual and 4-speed automatic transmissions were available, and all models were rear-wheel drive. Piazzas were available in a multitude of trim levels including Bella, XN, XJ, XE, XG, Nero, and others. There were three different suspension tuning levels, standard, Irmscher, and Lotus. Production continued through 1990.

For the US market, this vehicle was introduced as the Impulse in 1983. The 1987 model year had the RS model which came with a 4ZC1 turbo engine. The 1988 model year saw several changes. Mild exterior and interior changes were made to the appearance of the vehicle (including a larger rear spoiler and fixed headlights without pop up covers).

All Impulses received a Lotus-tuned suspension beginning in the 1988 model year, which consisted of redesigned sway bars, stiffer dampers, and a change in previous spring rates.

In the US market, the Impulse was marketed as "everything standard", meaning that all Impulses came with all available equipment for the vehicle's model year, and only two trim levels offered: non-turbo and Turbo. There were, however, some special edition models, most notably the RS model of the 1987 model year, available only in white body color with pewter color trim, and featuring the stiffest suspension available on any Impulse, very close to the Irmscher suspension sold only in Japan. For the 1989 model year, a Special Edition non-turbo model was offered which was equipped with the Turbo model wheels and interior trim.

The vehicle was sold as the Piazza in Europe and Australia, though introduced into these markets in 1985 or later.

In the UK the Piazza was sold in only one trim level and only Turbo form, with a 147 bhp 2.0 Turbocharged engine (4ZC1-T).

The Piazza had a shaky start in the UK with the first importer Isuzu GB, based in Maidstone, Kent going out of business in 1986, and London car dealer Alan Day bought the remaining stock of Piazzas at a bargain price. These cars were sold by Alan Day at significantly reduced price; the main reason Isuzu GB went out of business was due to high unit price. In 1987 International Motors Group of West Bromwich (IM Group) were awarded the official Isuzu franchise for the UK. (They also at the time represented Subaru and Hyundai in the UK.) IM Group still marketed the Piazza in single trim/engine form, but they only sold the updated 'Lotus' Piazza. The earlier cars sold by Day became known as 'pre-Lotus' cars; the suspension and handling of these pre-Lotus cars was derided by UK Press as poor, especially the live axle arrangement at the rear, which by the late '80s was seen to be antiquated. The updated 'Handling by Lotus' car was available from 1987 and the handling, although keeping the live axle arrangement, was transformed by Lotus in the UK after significant development work, involving modified suspension layouts, larger brakes, specially produced dampers and Goodyear tyres. The 'Handling by Lotus' cars had updated interior and exterior equipment. The exterior having a redesigned rear, with a large 'hoop' spoiler, new rear lamps, new rear badging with 'Handling by Lotus' badges and removal of the rubber side bumper strakes for a cleaner, more modern look. The updated interior trim was mainly 'tweed' check fabric, an updated centre console, but the loss of air conditioning to keep the price down for the UK market.

Isuzu (UK) Ltd, the West Bromwich-based importer, sold the Lotus Piazza from 1987 to 1989, before concentrating on the 4WD Isuzu Trooper. They never sold the second generation Piazza in the UK, nor was it sold in any European market.

In Australia, the Piazza was introduced very late (April 1986), and offered only in Turbo form. It was badged as a Holden Piazza. The first generation Piazza was replaced by the Opel Vectra based Holden Calibra in Australia.

Performance of the Turbo model was comparable to the Mitsubishi Starion/Dodge Conquest, as demonstrated by the fact that the acceleration and handling numbers reported by the auto enthusiast magazines were within 0.1–0.2 seconds between the vehicles.

In the US, the Impulse was replaced by the second generation Impulse after the end of the 1989 model year. However, in Japan, the first generation Piazza continued production and was available through the 1991 model year.

Second generation (JT22; 1990) 

The second generation Impulse was designed on General Motors's second generation R-body "world car" platform. GM had commissioned Isuzu to build a replacement for the Spectrum, this time a sportier model called the Storm (Gemini Coupe in Japan). The body design of the Storm was strongly influenced by GM and drew heavily from GM Europe's design submission for the Lotus Elan M100. Under Shiro Nakamura, Isuzu's then head of design, the third generation Gemini sedan was first designed on this platform, and then attention was turned to a sporty coupe to replace the first generation Impulse. Starting with the Storm, alternative front and rear treatments were made, retaining the "capsule" theme of the Gemini sedan, and drawing heavy influence from the rear-wheel drive Impulse (semi-concealed headlights with integrated grille as well as hood and taillight styling) while also expanding on the "European look", which later became a central point of marketing the vehicle in Japan.

The three-door hatchback debuted as the Impulse XS in 1989 for the 1990 model year. It was offered only in front-wheel drive with a DOHC 1.6 L (1588 cc) I4 engine which produced 130 hp (97 kW) and 102 lb·ft (138 Nm). The suspension consisted of MacPherson struts both front and rear, with a rigid trailing arm front suspension and a multi-link rear suspension, featuring Nishiboric passive steering.

For the 1991 model year, the Impulse RS was introduced with a 160 hp (119 kW) and 150 lb·ft (203 Nm) turbocharged engine and all-wheel drive drivetrain which featured rear viscous differential and center planetary differential and viscous coupling. The wagonback model was also introduced for the 1991 model year, only available with the normally aspirated 1.6 L engine.

For the 1992 model year, the Turbo model was discontinued and the base engine was replaced with a 1.8 L (1809 cc) engine, sharing the same bore but with a longer stroke due to the taller engine block. This larger powerplant was good for 140 hp (104 kW) and 125 lb·ft (169 Nm). Both body styles continued into 1992, but very few were produced.

Since the Impulse weighed just 2411 lb (1094 kg) in front-wheel drive configuration and 2732 lb (1239 kg) in all-wheel drive configuration, the turbo engine and all-wheel drive combined gave excellent performance.

General Motors, who owned nearly half of Isuzu, also owned Lotus Cars at the time. Lotus selected the 1.6-litre engine and transmission from the Isuzu Gemini for the Lotus Elan M100 and a following generation of that engine eventually ended up in the Impulse. Lotus was subcontracted by Isuzu to fine-tune the suspension of the Impulse, through selection of stiffer dampers, larger sway bars, and softer springs. All of the second generation Impulses had the Lotus-tuned suspension.

A non-Lotus innovation in the Impulse was the development of the Nishiboric passive rear-wheel steering system which adjusted the toe of the rear wheels by changing the rear wheel alignment through the range of suspension travel.

The combination of the burst of the Japanese economic bubble, rising emissions and crash safety requirements, and continued restrictive market segment changes by General Motors forced Isuzu out of the car making market and brought an end to the Impulse.

In the Japanese market, this vehicle was sold as the Piazza from July 1991 through the spring of 1992. The second generation Piazza was offered only in front-wheel drive with the 1.8 L engine. All of the second generation Piazzas came with the Lotus-tuned suspension. The Japanese were also offered the Geo Storm version of the Piazza, called the Piazza PA-Nero. This model was exclusive to the Japanese import dealership network Yanase Co., Ltd., under a special arrangement that sold GM products in Japan.

In Canada, the same models, with minor variations, were sold in the 1990 and 1991 model years. No Impulses were made for Canada for the 1992 model year. In 1993 the 1.8 L model was sold in Canada as the Asüna Sunfire, but only with the hatchback body. With the phaseout of the Asüna brand in 1993, the Sunfire name moved to a Pontiac, as its version of the third-generation Chevrolet Cavalier on the GM J platform rather than an Isuzu platform.

References

External links 

 IsuzuPiazza.com— Isuzu Piazza Online Community
 Isuzu Piazza Turbo Owners' Club (IPTOC) (Great Britain)

All-wheel-drive vehicles
Piazza
Rear-wheel-drive vehicles
Sport compact cars
Hatchbacks
1990s cars
Front-wheel-drive sports cars
Cars introduced in 1980
Cars discontinued in 1993